The 1979 Eastern Kentucky Colonels football team represented Eastern Kentucky University in the 1979 NCAA Division I-AA football season. They competed as a member of the Ohio Valley Conference and played their home games at Hanger Field in Richmond, Kentucky. Head coach Roy Kidd was in his 16th season leading the Colonels.

The team advanced to the 1979 NCAA Division I-AA Football Championship Game, where they defeated Lehigh, 30–7. After the championship win, Governor John Y. Brown Jr. declared the week of January 20–26, 1980, as "EKU National Football Champions Week" in the state.

Schedule

References

 

Eastern Kentucky
Eastern Kentucky Colonels football seasons
NCAA Division I Football Champions
Eastern Kentucky Colonels football